Béla Rerrich (26 November 1917 – 24 June 2005) was a Hungarian fencer. He won a silver medal in the team épée event at the 1956 Summer Olympics in Melbourne.

During the Melbourne Olympics the Hungarian revolution happened, and Rerrich decided not to go back to Hungary. He eventually ended up in Stockholm, Sweden where he successfully taught fencing for many years, being the fencing master of Djurgårdens IF Fäktförening, the fencing department of sports club Djurgårdens IF, from when it was founded in 1958 until his death.

References

External links
 

1917 births
2005 deaths
Hungarian male épée fencers
Olympic fencers of Hungary
Fencing in Sweden
Fencers at the 1948 Summer Olympics
Fencers at the 1952 Summer Olympics
Fencers at the 1956 Summer Olympics
Olympic silver medalists for Hungary
Olympic medalists in fencing
Martial artists from Budapest
Medalists at the 1956 Summer Olympics
Hungarian emigrants to Sweden
20th-century Hungarian people
21st-century Hungarian people